Christophe Gagliano (born 22 May 1967 in Paris) is a French judoka.

Achievements

References

External links
 
 
 

1967 births
Living people
Sportspeople from Paris
French male judoka
Judoka at the 1996 Summer Olympics
Olympic judoka of France
Olympic medalists in judo
Medalists at the 1996 Summer Olympics
Olympic bronze medalists for France
Mediterranean Games gold medalists for France
Mediterranean Games medalists in judo
Competitors at the 1997 Mediterranean Games
20th-century French people
21st-century French people